Iridomyrmecin is a defensive chemical, classified as an iridoid, isolated from ants of the genus Iridomyrmex. It has also evolved into a sex pheromone in wasps such as Leptopilina, with host species using the smell of iridomyrmecin as a way of detecting the presence of the parasitoid wasps. Iridomyrmecin is also found in a variety of plants including Actinidia polygama.

See also 
Cat pheromone#Cat attractants for other chemicals that have behavioural effects on cats

References 

Iridoids
Lactones
Cyclopentanes